Statistics of Portuguese Liga in the 1979–80 season.

Overview
It was contested by 16 teams, and Sporting Clube de Portugal won the championship.

League standings

Results

Season statistics

Top goalscorers

Footnotes

External links
 Portugal 1979-80 - RSSSF (Jorge Miguel Teixeira)
 Portuguese League 1979/80 - footballzz.co.uk
 Portugal - Table of Honor - Soccer Library 
 Portuguese Wikipedia - Campeonato Português de Futebol - I Divisão 1979/1980

Primeira Liga seasons
1979–80 in Portuguese football
Portugal